Tortuella is a genus of flowering plants belonging to the family Rubiaceae.

Its native range is Haiti.

Species:
 Tortuella abietifolia Urb. & Ekman

References

Rubiaceae
Rubiaceae genera